Richard Jozsa   is an Australian mathematician who holds the Leigh Trapnell Chair in Quantum Physics at the University of Cambridge. He is a fellow of King's College, Cambridge, where his research investigates quantum information science. A pioneer of his field, he is the co-author of the Deutsch–Jozsa algorithm and one of the co-inventors of quantum teleportation.

Education
Jozsa received his Doctor of Philosophy degree on twistor theory at Oxford, under the supervision of Roger Penrose.

Career and research
Jozsa has held previous positions at the University of Bristol, the University of Plymouth and the Université de Montréal.

Awards and honours
His work was recognised in 2004 by the London Mathematical Society with the award of the Naylor Prize for 'his fundamental contributions to the new field of quantum information science'. Since 2016, Jozsa is a member of the Academia Europaea.

References

Living people
Fellows of King's College, Cambridge
Cambridge mathematicians
Academics of the University of Bristol
Academics of the University of Plymouth
Australian mathematicians
Australian physicists
1953 births
Quantum information scientists